Something in Common is a studio album by American jazz bassist Sam Jones which was released on September 13, 1977 via the Muse label. Later the record with three bonus tracks was re-released on CD in 2000 and as a digital download in 2009.

Reception
Alex Henderson of Allmusic wrote "In the 1970s, Jones' recordings as a leader were quite consistent, and Something in Common is a rewarding example of the type of solid, hard-swinging bop and post-bop that people expected from him. The only Jones piece that the sextet embraces is "Seven Minds"; other selections were written by Hampton ("Every Man Is a King"), Walton ("Something in Common" and the better known "Bolivia"), and Mitchell ("Blue Silver"). Reviewer of All About Jazz stated "Jones’ only original tune from that 1978 album, “Seven Minds,” opens the CD with one of his ominous solos, backed by Higgins’ cymbaled shimmering and Walton’s upper-register ornamentation, before Jones leads into an enthralling, charging modal romp that challenges all of the players."

Track listing

Three songs, "Shoulders", "One for Amos", and "You Are the Sunshine of My Life", are bonus tracks from the 1974 album, Cedar Walton-Firm Roots, included in later releases.

Personnel

Musicians
Sam Jones – bass
Blue Mitchell – trumpet
Billy Higgins – drums
Bob Berg – sax (tenor)
Slide Hampton – trombone
Louis Hayes – drums
Cedar Walton – keyboards, producer, piano

Production
Todd Barkan – compilation producer, liner notes
Tom Copi – photography
Thomas Hampson – engineer
Chuck Irwin – engineer
Gene Paul – mastering
Bob Porter – original album producer
Page Simon – cover design
Dan Mueller – production coordination

References 

Sam Jones (musician) albums
1977 albums
Muse Records albums